Aaron is a Hellenized Hebrew masculine given name. The 'h' phoneme in the original Hebrew pronunciation "Aharon" (אהרן) is dropped in the Greek, Ἀαρών, from which the English form, Aaron, is derived.

Aaron, the brother of Moses, is described in the Torah, the Quran and the Baha'i Iqan.

The origin of the biblical name is uncertain; however, an Ancient Egyptian origin may indicate "aha rw" meaning "warrior lion",
P6-E23
or from Aaru, the Egyptian heaven ruled by Osiris.
M17-G1-D21-G43-M2-M2-M2
According to other different theories, the name could be derived from various Hebrew roots meaning "high mountain", "mountain of strength", "exalted", "enlightened", or "bearer of martyrs". The name Aharon may itself be a variant of Haran, the name given to the older brother of Abraham in the book of Genesis.

The given name was used by Jews and early Christians, then became exclusively Jewish in the Middle Ages, taken up by Gentiles in the 17th century, and popular among both in the end of the 20th century. Aaron was most popular in the United States in 1994 peaking as the 28th most popular name. Aaron is also a Jewish surname. St. Aaron's day is on July 1 and is celebrated in French speaking countries and Poland. The name is generally recognisable around the world as referring to the biblical Aaron and cognate forms in other languages include Aarón in Spanish; Aarão in Portuguese; Aron in Danish, Norwegian, Swedish and Croatian; Árón in Czech and Irish; and Harun (هارون) in Arabic. The variant used in the Russian language is "" (Aaron), with "" (Aron) being its colloquial form; diminutives include "" (Aaronka), "" (Aronka), and "" (Rona). The patronymics derived from this first name in Russian are "" (Aaronovich; masculine) and its colloquial form "" (Aaronych), and "" (Aaronovna; feminine).

Y-chromosomal Aaron is the name given to the hypothesised most recent common ancestor of many Kohanim.

"Aaronite" is a noun referring to the biblical tradition and modern genetic line of Kohanim claiming descent from the biblical Aaron. "Aaronic" is an adjective referring to their traditional priestly attributes such as attention to detail, respect for tradition, and religious dogmatising. For example, biblical texts focussed on rules and traditions such as Leviticus are considered aaronic.

Pronunciation
In its original Hebrew, Aharon (אהרן) is pronounced as three syllables, a-ha-ron. This Hebrew pronunciation is still used in modern Hebrew in Israel today. The Hebrew sound had no direct equivalent in Greek, when Jewish scriptures were translated by Greek-speaking Jews in Alexandria around 200 BCE to form the septuagint, so these translators used a pair of Greek alpha letters to approximate the same sound, "Ἀαρών". This was translated again by St. Jerome from the Greek to the Latin Vulgate as "Aaron" in the fourth century CE. It is thought that the Greeks and Romans would pronounce Aaron similarly to the Hebrew, as the Catholic Latin pronunciation is still defined this way.

The English pronunciation of the biblical Aaron's name was derived by anglicising the Latin during the Church of England's translation of the Authorized King James Bible in 1611 (possibly influenced by older English translations of the bible from Anglo Saxon times onwards). The modern Church of England Pronunciation Guide, the BBC pronunciation guide, the Church of Jesus Christ of Latter-day Saints pronunciation guide, the Oxford English Dictionary, the Longman pronunciation guide, and Harper Collins Biblical Pronunciation Guide all define this modern English pronunciation as /ˈɛərən/ ("air-run", where "air" is the same sound as in "dairy"). This pronunciation is used in the 1956 film The Ten Commandments featuring the biblical Aaron, by UK chief rabbi Jonathan Sacks when  speaking in English, and in the BBC production of Shakespeare's Titus Andronicus.

The English name "Aaron" is sometimes confused with the English name "Aron" which is also derived from the biblical Aaron but through translation routes other than the Church of England (e.g. Scandinavian and Celtic churches) and pronounced /ˈærən/ ("a-ran" as in "arrow"). It is further sometimes confused with the names Arran and Aran which are also pronounced /ˈærən/ ("a-ran" as in "arrow") but derive from various sources unrelated to the biblical Aaron such as the Scottish Isle of Arran and Irish Aran Islands. Aeron is another unrelated name, pronounced air-ron, thought to possibly be the name of a Celtic deity who is also the namesake of the popular Aeron chair. Possibly because of this confusion, the common pronunciation in Britain and some other English-speaking countries has changed over the last few decades to /ˈærən/.

People

Religion
Aaron of Aleth (died 552), saint, hermit, abbot and monk in Brittany
Aaron of Auxerre (died 807), a bishop of Auxerre locally venerated as a saint
Aaron of Caerleon (died 304), British martyr and saint
Aaron of Pinsk (died 1841), rabbi and author of Tosafot Aharon
Aaron (abbot) (died 1052), abbot of St. Martin, Cologne, Germany
Aaron (Copt), a Miaphysite Coptic saint
Aaron (saint), a saint of the Coptic Church
Aaron the Illustrious (or Aaron of the nuts) (born 4th century), an Armenian saint
Aaron Abiob (1535–1605), Turkish rabbi
Aaron He-Haver ben Yeshuah Alamani, 12th-century rabbi, physician, and poet
Aaron Bancroft (1755–1839), American clergyman
Aaron Burr Sr. (1716–1757), Presbyterian minister and college educator
Aaron Buzacott (1800–1864), British missionary and author
Aaron Lucius Chapin (1817–1892), American minister
Aaron Chorin (1766–1844), Hungarian rabbi and religious pioneer
Aaron Cleveland (1715–1757), Canadian clergyman
Aaron Cupino, Greek talmudist
Aaron Demsky, Israeli professor of biblical history
Aaron B. Grosh (1803–1884), American minister
Aaron Abba ben Johanan ha-Levi (died 1643), Ukrainian rabbi
Aaron Abraham ben Baruch Simeon ha-Levi, Jewish kabbalist
Aaron Hart (1670–1756), British rabbi
Aaron Hazzan, Jewish religious writer
Aaron Samuel Kaidanover (1614–1676), Polish-Lithuanian rabbi
Aaron Karfunkel (died 1816), Bohemian rabbi
Aaron Landes (1929–2014), American rabbi
Aaron Lapapa (1590–1674), Turkish Oriental rabbi and Talmudist
Aaron Leibowitz, American-Israeli rabbi
Aaron Jean-Marie Cardinal Lustiger (1926–2007), Archbishop Emeritus of Paris
Aaron Margalita (1663–1725), Polish rabbi
Aaron Monsonego (1929–2018), Moroccan rabbi
Aaron Moses ben Mordecai, Prussian cabalistic writer
Aaron D. Panken (1964–2018), American rabbi and academic administrator
Aaron Parry, American rabbi
Aaron Elijah Pumpianski (1835–1893), Russian rabbi and author
Aaron Rakeffet-Rothkoff (born 1937), American Professor of Rabbinic Literature
Aaron Raskin, American rabbi and writer
Aaron Riches (born 1974), Canadian theologian
Aaron Schechter, American Haredi rabbi
Aaron Scotus (late 10th century–1052), Irish abbot and musician
Aaron Crossley Hobart Seymour (1789–1870), Anglo-Irish religious author and hymn-writer
Aaron Tänzer (1871–1937), Austrian-German rabbi
Aaron Teitelbaum (born 1947), American chief rabbi
Aaron Twersky of Chernobyl (1784–1871), Ukrainian rabbi
Aaron Walden (1835–1912), Polish-Jewish Talmudist, editor, and author
Aaron Wilson (priest) (1589–1643), Anglican clergyman
Aaron Wise (1844–1896), American rabbi
Aaron Worms (1754–1836), German chief rabbi
Teófilo Vargas Seín (1921–2021), Puerto Rican religious leader renamed Aarón

Nobility
Aaron the Upright or Harun al-Rashid (ca. 763–809), Abbasid caliph
Aaron II (Khazar) (10th century)
Aron of Bulgaria (10th-century), Bulgarian noble

Science
Aaron Afia, Greek scientist, mathematician, philosopher, and physician
Aaron Alward (1828–1886), Canadian physician and political figure
Aaron T. Beck (1921–2021), American psychiatrist, founder of cognitive-behavior therapy
Aaron Belkin (born 1966), American political scientist, researcher and professor
Aaron Bodansky (1887–1960), Russian-American biochemist
Aaron L. Brody (1930–2021), American food scientist
Aaron Carroll, American pediatrician and professor
Aaron Cicourel, American sociologist and professor
Aaron Ciechanover (born 1947), Israeli Nobel laureate biologist
Aaron Clauset, American computer scientist
Aaron Cohen (1931–2010), Deputy director of NASA
Aaron Cohen-Gadol (born 1970), American neurological surgeon and professor
Aaron Devor (born 1951), Canadian sociologist and sexologist
Aaron M. Ellison (born 1960), American ecologist, photographer, sculptor, and writer
Aaron Esterson (1923–1999), British psychiatrist
Aaron Fenster, Canadian medical physicist
Aaron S. French (1823–1902), American industrialist and philanthropist
Aaron Goldberg (1917–2014), American botanist and parasitologist
Aaron Solomon Gumperz (1723–1769), Jewish-German physician and scholar
Aaron Halfaker (born 1983), American research scientist
Aaron Hawkins (born 1970), American engineer
Aaron Ismach (1920–2007), American scientist and inventor
Aaron Klug (1926–2018), British chemist and astrophysicist, Nobel laureate
Aaron B. Lerner (1920–2007), American physician, researcher, and professor 
Aaron Mair, epidemiological-spatial analyst and environmentalist 
Aaron Mannes (born 1970), American researcher 
Aaron Marcus (born 1943), American computer scientist 
Aaron E. Miller, American neurologist 
Aaron McDuffie Moore (1863–1923), American medical doctor 
Aaron Mujajati (born 1975), Zabian physician, author, and entrepreneur 
Aaron Novick (1919–2000), American biologist 
Aaron D. O'Connell (born 1981), American experimental quantum physicist 
Aaron Panofsky, American sociologist of science 
Aaron Parsons (born 1980), American astrophysicist 
Aaron Rosanoff (1878–1943), Russian-American psychiatrist 
Aaron Saxton (born 1974), New Zealand scientologist 
Aaron John Sharp (1904–1997), American botanist and bryologist 
Aaron Shatkin (1934–2012), American scientist and professor 
Aaron Shirley (1933–2014), American physician and civil rights activist 
Aaron Franklin Shull (1881–1961), American zoologist and professor 
Aaron Sloman, artificial intelligence scientist 
Aaron Louis Treadwell (1866–1947), American zoologist and professor 
Aaron Valero (1913–2000), Israeli physician and educator 
Aaron E. Wasserman (1920–2015), American food scientist 
Aaron Wildavsky (1930–1993), American political scientist 
Aaron D. Wyner (1939–1997), American information theorist 
Aaron Yazzie (born 1986), American mechanical engineer

Arts and entertainment

Actors and comedians 
 Aaron Abrams (born 1978), Canadian actor and writer
 Aaron Agassi (born 1988), Filipino actor and singer'
 Aaron Altaras (born 1995), German actor
 Aaron Aryanpur (born 1977/78), American stand-up comedian, artist, and voice actor
 Aaron Ashmore (born 1979), Canadian actor
 Aaron Aziz (born 1976), Singaporean actor, singer, and film director
 Aaron Carotta (born 1977), American television personality, travel blogger, and news reporter
 Aaron Craze, English celebrity chef
 Aaron Michael Davies (born 1984), American actor
 Aaron Dismuke (born 1992), American voice actor
Aaron Douglas (born 1971), Canadian actor
Aaron Eckhart (born 1968), American actor
Aaron Fa'aoso (born 1976), Australian actor, screenwriter, and producer
Aaron Faulls (born 1975), American television personality, filmmaker, musician, and marine conservationist
Aaron Frazier (born 1979), American actor
Aaron Goldsmith (born 1983), American sportscaster
Aaron Harber, American television talk show host
Aaron Heffernan (born 1990), Irish actor
Aaron Hill (born 1983), American actor
Aaron Himelstein (born 1985), American actor
Aaron Christian Howles (born 1993), American actor
Aaron Jakubenko (born 1988), Australian actor
Aaron Jeffcoate (born 1993), British actor
Aaron Jeffery, New Zealand-Australian actor
Aaron Karo (born 1979), American stand-up comedian and author
Aaron Katersky (born 1975), American radio news journalist
Aaron Kaufman (born 1982), American television personality, racing driver, and businessman
Aaron Kearney (born 1971), Australian broadcaster, journalist, and sports commentator
Aaron Krohn (born 1968), American actor and musician
Aaron Lazar, American actor, artist, and entrepreneur
Aaron Lebedeff (1873–1960), Yiddish theatre star
Aaron Lohr (born 1976), American actor and singer
Aaron McCargo Jr. (born 1971), American chef, television personality, and television show host
Aaron McCarthy, Australian TV presenter
Aaron McCusker (born 1978), Northern Irish actor
Aaron L. McGrath, Australian television and film actor
Aaron Meeks (born 1986), American actor
Aaron Michael Metchik (born 1980), American actor, writer, and director
Aaron Moloisi (born 1979), South African actor and television presenter
Aaron James Murphy (born 1992), New Zealand actor
Aaron O'Connell (born 1986), American model and actor
Aaron Osborne (1947–1995), American modern dancer and dance teacher
Aaron Paul (born 1979), American actor
Aaron Pedersen (born 1970), Australian television and film actor
Aaron Pierre (born 1994), English actor
Aaron Poole (born 1977), Canadian actor
Aaron Refvem (born 1997), American actor
Aaron Robison, British ballet dancer
Aaron Sagers, American television personality and entertainment journalist
Aaron Sanders (born 1996), American actor
Aaron Schoenke, American film and television actor, screenwriter, director, editor, producer, and cinematographer
Aaron Schwartz (born 1948/1949), Canadian actor, director, photographer, and copyright lawyer
Aaron Schwartz (born 1981), American actor
Aaron Sidwell (born 1988), English actor and singer
Aaron Sillis (born 1983), English dancer and choreographer
Aaron Smith (born 1976), American magician and writer 
Aaron Smolinski, Canadian actor
Aaron D. Spears (born 1971), American actor
Aaron Stanford (born 1976), American actor
Aaron Staton, American actor
Aaron Swartz, British actor and theatre and television director
Aaron Takahashi, American actor
Aaron Taylor-Johnson (born 1990), English actor
Aaron Tolson, American tap dancer
Aaron Walpole (born 1979), Canadian musical actor
Aaron Webber (born 1989), Canadian stage and screen actor
Aaron White (born 1980), American actor and director
Aaron Williams, American ventriloquist
Aaron Wolf, American actor, writer, and director
Aaron Yan (born 1985), Taiwanese actor and singer
Aaron Yonda (born 1973), American comedian, writer, actor, director, and YouTuber
Aaron Yoo (born 1979), American actor
Aaron Zebede, Panamanian stage actor, director, and producer

Artists and animators 
 Aaron Archer (born 1972), American illustrator
 Aaron Augenblick, American animator, director, and producer
 Aaron Beebe, American artist and curator
 Aaron Berkman (1900–1991), American painter
 Aaron Betsky (born 1958), American art, architecture, and design critic
 Aaron Blaise (born 1968), American painter, animator, film director, and art instructor
 Aaron Bohrod (1907–1992), American artist
 Aaron Bolot (1900–1989), Crimean-Australian architect
 Aaron Carpenter (born 1975), Canadian visual artist
 Aaron Chang (born 1956), American photographer
 Aaron Curry (born 1972), American painter and sculptor
 Aaron Curry (1974–2016), American graffiti artist known professionally as ORFN
 Aaron Dickson (born 1980), Irish artist and photographer
 Aaron Douglas (1899–1979), American painter, illustrator, and visual arts educator
 Aaron Fink (born 1955), American artist
 Aaron Fowler (born 1988), American contemporary interdisciplinary artist
 Aaron Henry Furlong, American jewelry designer
 Aaron Gelman (1899–1970), American artist
 Aaron Gilbert (born 1979), Cuban-American artist
 Aaron Goodelman (1890–1978), American sculptor
 Aaron Harry Gorson (1872–1933), American artist
 Aaron Green (1917–2001), American architect
 Aaron Hawks (born 1973), American multidisciplinary artist
 Aaron Horkey, American illustrator
 Aaron Horvath (born 1980), American animator, television writer, producer, and director
 Aaron Huey (born 1975), American photographer, explorer, activist, and storyteller
 Aaron Flint Jamison (born 1979), American conceptual artist and associate professor
 Aaron Krach (born 1972), American artist, writer, and journalist
 Aaron Kraten (born 1974), American mixed media artist
 Aaron Kuder, American comic book artist and writer
 Aaron Kuffner (born 1975), American conceptual artist
 Aaron Li-Hill (born 1986), Canadian visual artist and muralist
 Aaron Long (born 1990), Canadian animator and filmmaker
 Aaron Lopresti (born 1964), American comic book artist
 Aaron Messiah (1858–1940), French architect
 Aaron Nagel, American painter and trumpet player
 Aaron Nelson-Moody (born 1967), Canadian squamish carver
 Aaron Padilla (born 1974), American artist and art educator
 Aaron Edwin Penley (1806–1870), English painter
 Aaron Rose Philip (born 2001), Antiguan-American model, artist, and author
 Aaron Rapoport (born 1954), American photographer
 Aaron Renier, American comic artist
 Aaron Resnick (1914–1986), American architect
 Aaron Schwarz, American architect
 Aaron Draper Shattuck (1832–1928), American painter
 Aaron Shikler (1922–2015), American artist
 Aaron Siskind (1903–1991), American photographer
 Aaron Sopher (1905–1972), American artist
 Aaron Sowd (born 1970), American comic book creator, writer, and artist
 Aaron Spangler (born 1971), American sculptor and printmaker
 Aaron Springer, American cartoonist, animator, writer, director, storyboard artist, layout artist, and voice actor
 Aaron Tucker (born 1982), Canadian digital artist, writer, and educator
 Aaron Wexler (born 1974), American artist
 Aaron Williams, American cartoonist
 Aaron Young (born 1972), American artist

Filmmakers 
 Aaron Bergeron, American television writer and producer
 Aaron Brookner (born 1981), American film director and scriptwriter
 Aaron Burns (born 1985), American film producer, actor, film director, screenwriter, film editor, and cinematographer
 Aaron I. Butler, American film and television editor and producer
 Aaron Albert Carr (born 1963), Laguna Pueblo-Navajo documentary film maker and author
 Aaron Cohen (born 1976), Israeli-American writer, director, actor, author, and soldier
 Aaron Covington (born 1984), American screenwriter and sound designer
 Aaron Ehasz (born 1973), American screenwriter and television producer
 Aaron Glascock, American sound editor
 Aaron Godfred, American film, television, and digital producer
 Aaron Guzikowski, American screenwriter
 Aaron Harberts (born 1973), American television writer and producer
 Aaron Harvey (born 1980), American film director and writer
 Aaron Hillis, American writer, film critic, director, film festival programmer, and curator
 Aaron Hoffman (1880–1924), American writer and lyricist
 Aaron Johnston, American author, comics writer, and film producer
 Aaron Douglas Johnston, American filmmaker
 Aaron Katz (born 1981), American filmmaker
 Aaron Kaufman (born 1974), American film producer and director
 Aaron Kopp, American cinematographer and film director
 Aaron Korsh (born 1966), American television producer, writer, and investment banker
 Aaron Kozak (born 1983), American playwright and filmmaker
 Aaron Lipstadt (born 1952), American film director, television director, and producer
 Aaron Lubarsky, American documentary filmmaker
 Aaron Lustig (born 1956), American film and television actor
 Aaron McGruder (born 1974), American writer, cartoonist, and producer
 Aaron Moorhead (born 1987), American film director, producer, cinematographer, editor, and actor
 Aaron Norris (born 1951), American stunt performer, director, actor, and producer
 Aaron Ohlmann, American filmmaker
 Aaron Paquette (born 1974), Canadian writer, artist, speaker, and politician
 Aaron Platt (born 1981), American film director and cinematographer
 Aaron Posner, American playwright and theater director
 Aaron Pugliese, American writer, director, and producer
 Aaron Rhyne, American video and projection designer
 Aaron Rochin, American sound engineer
 Aaron Rose, American film director, artist, exhibition curator, and writer
 Aaron Ruben (1914–2010), American television director and producer
 Aaron Ruell (born 1976), American director, photographer, and actor
 Aaron Ryder, American film producer
 Aaron Saidman (born 1974), American creator-developer, documentary filmmaker, and television producer
 Aaron Schneider (born 1965), American filmmaker and cinematographer
 Aaron Shure, American television writer, director, and producer
 Aaron Simpson (born 1971), American animation producer
 Aaron Smith, co-creator of Australian TV series You Can't Ask That
 Aaron Sorkin (born 1961), American screenwriter, producer and playwright
 Aaron Spelling (1923–2006), American film and television producer
 Aaron Stell (1911–1996), American film editor
 Aaron Rahsaan Thomas, American television and film screenwriter and producer
 Aaron Waltke (born 1984), American screenwriter, television producer, and showrunner
 Aaron Wilson, Australian film director and writer
 Aaron Woodley (born 1971), Canadian film director and screenwriter
 Aaron Woolfolk (born 1969), American film director, screenwriter, producer, and playwright
 Aaron Zelman, American television writer and producer

Musicians 
 Aaron Accetta (born 1971), American record producer, songwriter, and musician
 Aaron Aedy, rhythm guitarist of English doom metal band Paradise Lost
Aaron Atayde (born 1986), Filipino DJ, TV host, and sports anchor
Aaron Avshalomov (1894–1965), Russian composer
Aaron Axelsen, American DJ
Aaron Barker (born 1953), American singer-songwriter
Aaron Bedard (born 1969), American musician
Aaron Bell (musician) (1921–2003), American jazz double-bassist
Aaron Benward (born 1973), American singer-songwriter, actor, film and television producer, and music supervisor
Aaron Bertram (born 1981), American trumpet player
Aaron Bing, American jazz saxophonist
Aaron Black, lead singer of the band Capitol Offense
Aaron Bow (born 1992), American record producer and songwriter
Aaron Bridgers (1918–2003), American jazz pianist
Aaron A. Brooks (born 1964), American rock musician, drummer, producer, and composer
Aaron Brown (musician) (born 1980), Australian-American violinist and composer
Aaron Bruno (born 1978), American singer, songwriter, and musician
Aaron Buchanan, lead singer for the band Aaron Buchanan & The Cult Classics
Aaron Burckhard (born 1963), American musician and drummer
Aaron Carter (1987-2022), American singer
Aaron Cassidy (born 1976), American composer
Aaron Copland (1900–1990), American composer, composition teacher, writer, and conductor
Aaron Cohen (actor), American rapper
Aaron Cole (born 1999), American recording artist and songwriter
Aaron Collins (singer) (1930–1997), American singer
Aaron Cometbus (born 1968), American musician, songwriter, roadie, and magazine editor
Aaron Copland (1900–1990), American composer, composition teacher, writer, and conductor
Aaron Crabb, Christian musician
Aaron Crawford (musician), American drummer for the band Flee the Seen
Aaron Cupples, Australian film composer, record producer, and musician
Aaron Dai (born 1967), American composer and pianist
Aaron Dalbec, American guitarist
Aaron Davis (born 1990), British rapper and actor known professionally as Bugzy Malone
Aaron Deer (born 1980), American songwriter and multi-instrumentalist
Aaron Dessner (born 1976), American musician, songwriter, record producer, and record label founder
Aaron Detroit, American musician, zine writer, and music journalist
Aaron Diehl (born 1985), American jazz pianist
Aaron Dilloway (born 1976), American musician
Aaron Dugan (born 1977), American guitarist, composer, and songwriter
Aaron Dworkin (born 1970), American violinist and music educator
Aaron Embry (born 1975), American songwriter and record producer
Aaron Eshuis, American songwriter and record producer
Aaron Espe (born 1981), American singer-songwriter, instrumentalist, and record producer
Aaron Fink, American guitarist for the band Breaking Benjamin
Aaron Ford, American drummer for the band ...And You Will Know Us by the Trail of Dead
Aaron Freeman (born 1970), American singer, songwriter
Aaron Fruchtman, American composer, conductor, musicologist
Aaron Funk (born 1975), breakcore artist most popularly known as Venetian Snares
Aaron Gervais, Canadian composer
Aaron Gillespie (born 1983), drummer/vocalist of UnderOath and live drummer of Paramore
Aaron Goldberg (born 1974), American jazz pianist
Aaron Goldstein (musician) (born 1983), Canadian musician, songwriter, and record producer
Aaron Goodvin, Canadian-American country music singer and songwriter
Aaron Green (born 1994), American musician and record producer known professionally as Mr. Green
Aaron Hall (singer) (born 1964), American singer and songwriter
Aaron Harris (drummer) (born 1977), American musician, composer, and drummer for the band Isis
Aaron Harris, American drummer for the band Islands
Aaron Heick (born 1961), American saxophonist and woodwind player
Aaron James (organist) (born 1986), Canadian organist and musicologist
Aaron Johnson (musician) (born 1977), American music producer
Aaron Krister Johnson, American composer, musician, and teacher
Aaron M. Johnson (born 1991), American jazz saxophonist and bandleader
Aaron Jones, member of the Scottish band Old Blind Dogs
Aaron Kelly (singer) (born 1993), American singer
Aaron Jay Kernis (born 1960), American composer
Aaron Keyes (born 1978), American Christian musician
Aaron Kwak (born 1993), American singer and sub-vocalist of NU'EST
Aaron Kwok (born 1965), Hong Kong singer, dancer and actor
Aaron LaCrate, American music producer, recording artist, DJ, fashion designer, and film director
Aaron Leaney, Canadian saxophonist and composer
Aaron Levinson, American producer, musician, composer, and record label owner
Aaron Lewis (musician) (born 1972), member of band Staind
Aaron Lines (born 1977), Canadian country musician
Aaron London, British singer, songwriter, producer, and rapper
Aaron Marsh, American singer, songwriter, musician, and record producer
Aaron McMillan (1977–2007), Australian pianist
Aaron Neville (born 1941), American singer
Aaron North (born 1979), American musician
Aaron Novik (born 1974), American composer, clarinetist, and bandleader
Aaron Parks (born 1983), American jazz pianist
Aaron Parrett (born 1967), American musician, author, printer, and educator
Aaron Pauley (born 1988), American singer, songwriter, and musician
Aaron Pfenning (born 1983), American multi-instrumentalist, singer-songwriter, and record producer
Aaron Pilsan (born 1995), Austrian pianist
Aaron Pritchett (born 1970), Canadian country musician
Aaron-Carl Ragland (1973–2010), American electronic dance musician
Aaron Richmond (1895–1965), American performing arts manager, pianist, impresario, and educator
Aaron Rimbui (born 1979), Kenyan pianist, keyboardist, bandleader, producer, festival curator, and radio host
Aaron Robertson, American drummer for the band Myka Relocate
Aaron Robinson (born 1970), American composer, conductor, and musicologist
Aaron Rosand (1927–2019), American violinist
Aaron Rossi (born 1980), American drummer for the band Prong
Aaron Roterfeld, Austrian musician and songwriter
Aaron Sachs (1923–2014), American jazz saxophonist and clarinetist
Aaron Sarlo, American singer-songwriter and comedian
Aaron Schroeder (1926–2009), American songwriter and music publisher
Aaron Scott (musician) (born 1956), American composer and jazz drummer
Aaron Seeman, American composer, pianist, and accordion player
Aaron Shanley (born 1990), Irish singer-songwriter and musician
Aaron Shaw, American bagpipe player in the Wicked Tinkers
Aaron Shearer (1919–2008), American guitarist
Aaron Sheehan (born 1975), American vocal tenor and music professor
Aaron Shust (born 1975), American Christian musician
Aaron Smith (born 1950), American drummer and percussionist
Aaron Smith (born 1985), American rapper known professionally as Shwayze
Aaron Smith, American music producer and DJ
Aaron Smith, guitarist for the American band Brazil
Aaron Solowoniuk (born 1974), member of band Billy Talent
Aaron James Sorensen (born 1966), Canadian musician, writer, producer, and film director
Aaron Soul, British singer and songwriter
Aaron Sperske, American drummer
Aaron Spiro (born 1975), American record producer
Aaron Sprinkle (born 1974), American singer, songwriter, and record producer
Aaron Stainthorpe (born 1968), English singer and songwriter
Aaron Sterling (born 1980), American drummer, producer, engineer, and session musician
Aaron Stern, American musician
Aaron Lee Tasjan (born 1986), American singer-songwriter, guitarist, and record producer
Aaron Tippin (born 1958), American country musician and record producer
Aaron Tokona (1975–2020), New Zealand guitarist and singer
Aaron Tsang (born 1985), Canadian composer
Aaron Turner (born 1977), American musician, singer, graphic artist, and record producer
Aaron Tveit, (born 1983), American singer and film and theatre actor
Aaron Walker (1910–1975), American blues musician, composer, songwriter, and multi-instrumentalist known professionally as T-Bone Walker
Aaron Watson (born 1977), American country singer and songwriter
Aaron Weinstein, American musician
Aaron Williams (composer) (1731–1776), Welsh teacher, composer, and music compiler
Aaron Williams (born 1993), American DJ, radio host, web personality, event producer, entrepreneur, and marketing executive, known professionally as DJ A-Tron
Aaron Charles Wills (born 1974), aka P-Nut member of band 311
Aaron Dontez Yates (born 1971), American rapper, also known as Tech N9NE
Aaron Zigman (born 1963), American composer, producer, arranger, songwriter, and musician

Politics and business

Businessmen 
Aaron of Lincoln (c. 1125–1186), English Jewish financier believed to be the wealthiest person in Norman England
Aaron Aaronsohn (1876–1919), Romanian-born Jewish scientist, traveller, entrepreneur, and politician
Aaron Bay-Schuck (born 1981), American music industry executive, CEO and co-chairman of Warner Records
Aaron Buerge (born 1974), American banker, businessman, and television personality
Aaron Buff (1911–1994), American chair maker
Aaron Columbus Burr (1808–1882), American jeweler
Aaron Cardozo (1762–1834), English businessman
Aaron Commodore (1819/1820–1892), American businessman, politician, and former slave
Aaron T. Demarest (1841–1908), American automobile manufacturer
Aaron Lufkin Dennison (1812–1895), American watchmaker and businessman
Aaron Dignan (born 1979), American businessman and writer
Aaron Fechter (born 1953), engineer and founder of ShowBiz Pizza Place
Aaron Feuerstein (1925–2021), American industrialist, philanthropist, and CEO of Malden Mills
Aaron Fish (producer) (born 1962), Canadian entrepreneur
Aaron Fleishhacker (1820–1898), German-American businessman
Aaron Frenkel (born 1957), Israeli businessman and investor
Aaron Fulkerson, American information technology businessman and founder of MindTouch, Inc.
Aaron Gural (1917–2009), American chairman of Newmark & Company
Aaron Hart (1724–1800), Canadian businessman
Aaron Hillegass (born 1969), American businessman
Aaron Iba (born 1983), American computer programmer and entrepreneur
Aaron Isaac (1730–1817), Jewish seal engraver and merchant
Aaron Jack (born 1975), American businessman and politician
Aaron Kirman, American real estate agent and investor
Aaron Kirunda (born 1985), Ugandan social entrepreneur and public figure
Aaron Kitchell (1744–1820), American blacksmith and politician
Aaron Koblin (born 1982), American digital media artist and entrepreneur
Aaron LaBerge, American technology executive
Aaron Lansky (born 1955), American businessman
Aaron Levie (born 1984), founder and CEO of Box
Aaron Lopez (1731–1782), Portuguese merchant, slave trader, and philanthropist
Aaron McCormack (born 1971), Irish business executive
Aaron Montgomery Ward (1843–1913), American businessman
Aaron Mushimba (1946–2014), Namibian businessman
Aaron Naparstek (born 1970), American businessman, founder of Streetsblog
Aaron Nusbaum (1859–1936), American entrepreneur and philanthropist
Aaron Olmsted (1753–1806), American sea captain and businessman
Aaron Patzer (born 1980), American internet entrepreneur
Aaron Peasley (1775–1837), American button maker
Aaron W. Plyler (1926–2016), American businessman and politician
Aaron Pott, American winemaker and businessman
Aaron Rasmussen, American game designer and co-founder of MasterClass
Aaron Rathborne (1571/1572–1605-1622), English land surveyor and mathematician
Aaron Rose (pioneer) (1813–1899), American pioneer of Michigan and Oregon, founder of Roseburg, Oregon
Aaron Y. Ross (1829–1922), American gold miner, stage coach driver, and train guard
Aaron Rubashkin (1927/1928–2020), Russian-American businessman
Aaron Russo (1943–2007), American entertainment businessman, film producer, director, and political activist
Aaron Selber Jr. (1927–2013), American businessman and philanthropist
Aaron Shapiro, American entrepreneur, marketing executive, and investor
Aaron Silverman, American chef and restaurateur
Aaron Simpson (producer) (born 1972), British businessman, entrepreneur, and film producer
Aaron Simril (born 1988), Senior Director Insurance, LendingTree Insurance VIP
Aaron Skonnard, American businessman and CEO of Pluralsight
Aaron Sojourner (born 1972), American economist and professor
Aaron Solomon, Jewish merchant
Aaron S. Stern (1854–1920), American clothing firm executive and theatrical producer
Aaron Swartz (1986–2013), American writer, internet campaigner, and entrepreneur
Aaron Sweet (1854–1937), Canadian merchant and politician
Aaron Traywick (1989–2018), American businessman and life extension activist
Aaron Willard (1757–1844), British-American entrepreneur, industrialist, and clock designer
Aaron S. Williams, American international development expert and diplomat

Politicians and judges 
 Aaron Ben-zion ibn Alamani, 12th century Egyptian judge
 Aaron Austin (1745–1829) justice of the Connecticut Supreme Court
Aaron Ayers (1836–1900), New Zealand politician, hairdresser, and tobacconist
Aaron Aylward, American politician
Aaron Barschak (born 1966), English politician
Aaron Bean (born 1967), American politician
Aaron Bell (born 1980), British politician
Aaron Benavot, American global education policy analyst
Aaron T. Bliss (1837–1906), American politician
Aaron Alpeoria Bradley (1815–1881), American lawyer and politician
Aaron Bernstine (born 1984), American politician
Aaron Broussard (born 1949), American politician
Aaron V. Brown (1795–1859), American politician
Aaron Bugeja, Maltese judge
Aaron Burr (1756–1836), American politician
Aaron Chapman (politician) (1771–1850), English writer and politician
Aaron Cheruiyot (born 1986), Kenyan politician
Aaron Clark (1787–1861), American politician
Aaron Clausen (born 1977), American politician
Aaron Van Schaick Cochrane (1858–1943), American politician
Aaron Coleman (born 2000), American politician
Aaron H. Conrow (1824–1865), American politician and soldier
Aaron H. Cragin (1821–1898), American politician
Aaron Curry (politician) (1887–1957), English politician
Aaron Ago Dagang (born 1958), Malaysian politician
Aaron Davidson (born 1971), American lawyer and businessman
Aaron Dillaway (born 1971), Australian politician
Aaron Dixon (born 1949), American activist and captain of the Black Panther Party
Aaron Edlin (born 1967), American economist and lawyer
Aaron Farrugia (born 1980), Maltese politician
Aaron D. Ford (born 1972), American lawyer and politician
Aaron L. Ford (1903–1983), American politician
Aaron Freeman (politician), American lawyer and politician
Aaron Frey (born 1978), American lawyer and politician
Aaron Fricke (born 1962), American gay rights activist and author
Aaron Friedberg (born 1956), American political scientist
Aaron Fussell (1923–2014), American politician and educator
Aaron Gadama, Malawian politician
Aaron B. Gardenier (1848–1909), American lawyer and politician
Aaron Gilmore (born 1973), New Zealand politician
Aaron Goodrich (1807–1887), American lawyer, jurist, and diplomat
Aaron H. Grout (1879–1966), American judge and political figure
Aaron Hackley Jr. (1783–1868), American politician and slaveholder
Aaron Harding (1805–1875), American politician and slaveholder
Aaron Harlan (1802–1868), American politician
Aaron Harper (born 1967), Australian politician
Aaron Hawkins (born 1983/1984), New Zealand politician
Aaron Henry (1922–1997), American civil rights leader and politician
Aaron Hobart (1787–1858), American politician
Aaron Jackson (activist), American human rights and environmental activist
Aaron Jaffe (born 1930), American politician and lawyer
Aaron Jernigan (1813–1891), American adventurer and politician
Aaron Ling Johanson (born 1980), American politician
Aaron Kaufer (born 1988), American politician
Aaron Klein (born 1979), American-Israeli political commentator, journalist, strategist, writer, and senior advisor
Aaron Krauter (born 1956), American politician
Aaron Shenk Kreider (1863–1929), American politician
Aaron J. Levy (1881–1955), American lawyer and politician
Aaron Leland (1761–1832), American minister and politician
Aaron Libby (born 1983), American politician
Aaron Lieberman, American politician
Aaron Lyle (1759–1825), American politician
Aaron Matson (1770–1855), American politician
Aaron V. McAlvay (1847–1915), American judge
Aaron Manasses McMillan (1895–1980), American politician
Aaron McWilliams (born 1983), American politician
Aaron Michlewitz, American politician
Aaron Miller (politician) (born 1987), American politician and educator
Aaron Mosher (1881–1959), Canadian labour leader and trade unionist
Aaron Albert Mossell (1863–1951), Canadian lawyer
Aaron Motsoaledi (born 1958), South African politician
Aaron Ogden (1756–1839), American soldier, lawyer, and politician
Aaron Pargas Ojeda, Puerto Rican politician
Aaron Mike Oquaye (born 1944), Ghanaian barrister and politician
Aaron Ortiz, American politician
Aaron Osmond (born 1969), American politician
Aaron Peña (born 1959), American attorney and politician
Aaron F. Perry (1815–1893), American lawyer and politician
Aaron Persky (born 1962), American attorney and judge
Aaron Peskin (born 1964), American elected official
Aaron Peterson (born 1970), American politician
Aaron Pike (born 1981), American activist
Aaron Pilkington (born 1991), American politician
Aaron Porter (born 1985), English politician
Aaron Reardon (politician), American politician and lobbyist
Aaron Regunberg (born 1990), American progressive activist and politician
Aaron Rehkop (1891–1967), American politician and U.S. Army soldier
Aaron Rhodes (born 1949), American-German human rights activist and writer
Aaron Ringel, American political advisor
Aaron Ringera (born 1950), Kenyan lawyer and judge
Aaron B. Rollins (1818–1878), American politician
Aaron Rule (born 1967), Australian politician
Aaron Sangala (born 1958), Malawian politician
Aaron Sapiro (1884–1959), American cooperative activist, lawyer, and major leader in the farmers movement
Aaron A. Sargent (1827–1887), American journalist, lawyer, politician, and diplomat
Aaron W. Sawyer (1818–1882), American judge
Aaron Schock (born 1981), American politician
Aaron A. F. Seawell (1864–1950), American politician and jurist
Aaron Shaw (representative) (1811–1887), American politician
Aaron Smith (conspirator) (died 1701), English lawyer involved in plots
Aaron Soltz (1872–1945), Soviet politician and lawyer
Aaron Dwight Stevens (1831–1860), American abolitionist
Aaron Stewart (1845–1910), British trade unionist
Aaron Stiles (born 1979), American politician and lawyer
Aaron Stonehouse (born 1990), Australian politician
Aaron Titlow (1857–1923), American lawyer and politician
Aaron D. Truesdell, American politician
Aaron Twerski (born 1939), American lawyer and professor
Aaron Vail (1796–1878), American diplomat
Aaron Van Camp (1816–1892), American espionage agent
Aaron Vanderpoel (1799–1870), American politician
Aaron Vega (born 1970), American politician
Aaron E. Waite (1813–1898), American judge and politician
Aaron Walters (1809–1889), American politician
Aaron Ward (representative) (1790–1867), American lawyer and politician
Aaron S. Watkins (1863–1941), American politician and Methodist minister
Aaron L. Weisman (born 1965), American attorney
Aaron Woodruff (1762–1817), American politician
Aaron Abel Wright (1840–1922), Canadian politician
Aaron Zebley, American attorney and FBI special agent
Aaron S. Zelman (1946–2010), American gun rights advocate, author, and founder of Jews for the Preservation of Firearms Ownership
Aaron Zundelevich (1852–1923), Jewish-Russian revolutionary narodnik

Military 
 Aaron Anderson (Medal of Honor) (1811–1886), Union Navy sailor and Medal of Honor recipient
 Aaron Baker (1610–1683), English colonial agent
 Aaron Bank (1902–2004), U.S. Army colonel
 Aaron Beng (born 1982), Singaporean rear-admiral
 Aaron Bradshaw Jr. (1894–1976), U.S. Army major general
 Aaron Daggett (1837–1938), U.S. Army officer
 Aaron R. Dean II, U.S. Army brigadier general
 Aaron R. Fisher (1895–1985), U.S. Army soldier
 Aaron Fuller (1738–1816), American military official
 Aaron Hankinson (1735–1806), American military officer and politician
 Aaron R. Hudson (died 1907), American soldier and Medal of Honor recipient
 Aaron Katz (Soviet general) (1901–1971), Soviet Red Army major general
 Aaron S. Lanfare (1824–1875), American Union Army first lieutenant and Medal of Honor recipient
 Aaron S. Merrill (1890–1961), American U.S. Navy rear admiral
 Aaron Prupas, U.S. Air Force major general
 Aaron Fletcher Stevens (1819–1887), U.S. Army officer and politician
 Aaron B. Tompkins (1844–1931), U.S. Army soldier, Medal of Honor recipient
 Aaron Tozer (1788–1854), English Royal Navy captain
 Aaron Ward (sailor) (1851–1918), U.S. Navy officer

Sports

Baseball 
 Aaron Altherr (born 1991), American baseball player
 Aaron Ashby (born 1998), American baseball pitcher
 Aaron Barrett (born 1988), American baseball pitcher
 Aaron Bates (born 1984), American baseball player
 Aaron Blair (born 1992), American baseball pitcher
 Aaron Boone (born 1973), American baseball player, manager
 Aaron Brooks (born 1990), American baseball pitcher
 Aaron Bummer (born 1993), American baseball pitcher
 Aaron Civale (born 1995), American baseball pitcher
 Aaron Clapp (1856–1914), American baseball player
 Aaron Cook (born 1979), American baseball pitcher
 Aaron Crow (born 1986), American baseball pitcher
 Aaron Cunningham (born 1986), American baseball player
 Aaron Durley (born 1993), American baseball player
 Aaron Fletcher (born 1996), American baseball pitcher
 Aaron Fultz (born 1973), American baseball pitcher
 Aaron Guiel (born 1972), Canadian baseball player
 Aaron Harang (born 1978), American baseball pitcher
 Aaron Heilman (born 1978), American baseball pitcher
 Aaron Herr (born 1981), American baseball player
 Aaron Hicks (born 1989), American baseball player
 Aaron Hill (baseball) (born 1982), American baseball player
 Aaron Holbert (born 1973), American baseball player
 Aaron Judge (born 1992), American baseball player
 Aaron Laffey (born 1985), American baseball pitcher
 Aaron Ledesma (born 1971), American baseball player
 Aaron Looper (born 1976), American baseball pitcher
 Aaron Loup (born 1987), American baseball player
 Aaron Meade (born 1988), American baseball pitcher and coach
 Aaron Miles (born 1976), American baseball player
 Aaron Myette (born 1977), Canadian baseball pitcher
 Aaron Nola (born 1993), American baseball player
 Aaron Northcraft (born 1990), American baseball pitcher
 Aaron Pointer (born 1942), American baseball player
 Aaron Poreda (born 1986), American baseball player
 Aaron Rakers (born 1977), American baseball pitcher
 Aaron Robinson (baseball) (1915–1966), American baseball player
 Aaron Rowand (born 1977), American baseball player
Aaron Russell (baseball) (1879–1949), American baseball player
Aaron Sabato (born 1999), American baseball player
Aaron Sanchez (baseball) (born 1992), American baseball pitcher
Aaron Scheffer (born 1975), American baseball pitcher
Aaron Sele (born 1970), American baseball pitcher
Aaron Senne (born 1987), American baseball player
Aaron Albert Silvera (1935–2002), American baseball player
Aaron Slegers (born 1992), American baseball pitcher
Aaron Small (born 1971), American baseball pitcher
Aaron Stevens (baseball), American college baseball coach
Aaron Taylor (baseball) (born 1977), American baseball pitcher
Aaron Thompson (born 1987), American baseball pitcher
Aaron Ward (baseball) (1896–1961), American baseball player
Aaron Whitefield (born 1996), Australian baseball player
Aaron Wilkerson (born 1989), American baseball pitcher
Aaron Zavala (born 2000), American baseball player

Basketball 
 Aaron Aban (born 1982), Filipino basketball player
 Aaron Anderson (basketball) (born 1991), American basketball player
 Aaron Bailey-Nowell (born 1981), New Zealand basketball player
 Aaron Best (basketball) (born 1992), Canadian basketball player
 Aaron Black (basketball) (born 1996), Filipino-American basketball player
 Aaron Brooks (basketball) (born 1985), American basketball player
 Aaron Bruce (born 1984), Australian basketball player
 Aaron Cel (born 1987), French-Polish basketball player
 Aaron Cook Jr. (born 1997), American basketball player
 Aaron Craft (born 1991), American basketball player
 Aaron Davis (born 1979), American basketball player
 Aaron Doornekamp (born 1985), Canadian basketball player
 Aaron Epps (born 1996), American basketball player
 Aaron Falzon (born 1996), Maltese basketball player
 Aaron Fuller (born 1989), American basketball player
 Aaron Geramipoor (born 1992), British-Iranian basketball player
 Aaron Gordon (born 1995), American basketball player
 Aaron Gray (born 1984), American basketball player
 Aaron Harper (basketball) (born 1981), American basketball player
 Aaron Harrison (born 1994), American basketball player
 Aaron Henry (basketball) (born 1999), American basketball player
 Aaron Holiday (born 1996), American basketball player
 Aaron Jackson (basketball) (born 1986), American basketball player
 Aaron James (basketball) (born 1952), American basketball player
 Aaron Johnson (basketball) (born 1988), American basketball player
 Aaron Johnston (basketball), American woman's basketball coach
 Aaron Jones (basketball) (born 1993), American basketball player
 Aaron Lucas (born 1979), American basketball player
 Aaron McGhee (born 1979), American basketball player
 Aaron McKie (born 1972), American basketball player and coach
 Aaron Miles (basketball) (born 1983), American basketball player and coach
 Aaron Nesmith (born 1999), American basketball player
 Aaron Olson (born 1978), Canadian-New Zealand basketball player
 Aaron Owens (born 1974), American basketball player
 Aaron Roussell, American basketball coach
 Aaron Swinson (born 1971), American basketball player
 Aaron Trahair (born 1978), Australian basketball player
 Aaron Valdes (born 1993), American basketball player
 Aaron Westbrooks (born 1986), Irish basketball player
Aaron White (basketball) (born 1992), American basketball player
Aaron Wiggins (born 1999), American basketball player
Aaron Williams (basketball) (born 1971), American basketball player
Aaron Pervis Williams (born 1991), American basketball player

Boxing 

 Aaron Alafa (born 1983), American boxer
 Aaron Brown (1883–1934), American boxer known professionally as Dixie Kid
 Aaron Davis (boxer) (born 1967), American boxer
 Aaron Garcia (boxer) (born 1982), American boxer
 Aaron Herrera (boxer) (born 1990), Mexican boxer
 Aaron Mitchell (boxer), American boxer
 Aaron Popoola (born 1942), Ghanaian boxer
 Aaron Prince (born 1986), Trinidad and Tobago boxer
 Aaron Pryor (1955–2016), American boxer, a former world boxing champion
 Aaron Torres (born 1978), American boxer
 Aaron Wade (1916–1985), American boxer
 Aaron Williams (boxer) (born 1986), American boxer

Cricket 

 Aaron Ayre (born 1992), Australian cricketer
 Aaron Barnes (cricketer) (born 1971), New Zealand cricketer
 Aaron Beard (born 1997), English cricketer
 Aaron Bird (born 1983), Australian cricketer
 Aaron Bradley (born 1974), New Zealand cricketer
 Aaron Cawley (born 1999), Irish cricketer
 Aaron Daley (cricketer, born 1956), Jamaican cricketer
 Aaron Finch (born 1986), Australian cricketer
 Aaron Gale (born 1970), New Zealand cricketer
 Aaron Gillespie (cricketer) (born 1997), Irish cricketer
 Aaron Hamilton (born 1978/1979), Australian cricket coach
 Aaron Hardie (born 1999), Australian cricketer
 Aaron Heal (born 1983), Australian cricketer
 Aaron Heywood, Irish cricketer
 Aaron Jeavons (born 1989), English cricketer
 Aaron Jones (cricketer) (born 1994), Barbadian cricketer
 Aaron Laraman (born 1979), English cricketer
 Aaron Nye (born 1978), Australian cricketer
 Aaron O'Brien (born 1981), Australian cricketer
 Aaron Phangiso (born 1984), South African cricketer
 Aaron Redmond (born 1979), New Zealand cricketer
 Aaron Summers (cricketer) (born 1996), Australian cricketer
 Aaron Thomas (cricketer) (born 1985), English cricketer
 Aaron Thomason (born 1997), English cricketer
 Aaron Wright (cricketer) (born 1997), Irish cricketer

Football 
 Aaron Adeoye (born 1993), American football player
 Aaron Bailey (American football) (born 1971), American football player
 Aaron Banks (American football) (born 1997), American football player
 Aaron Beasley (born 1973), American football player
 Aaron Berry (born 1988), American football player
 Aaron Best (born 1978), American football player and head coach
 Aaron Boone (American football) (born 1978), American football player
 Aaron Brant (born 1984), American football player
 Aaron Brewer (long snapper) (born 1990), American football player
 Aaron Brewer (offensive lineman) (born 1997), American football player
 Aaron Brooks (American football) (born 1976), American football player
 Aaron Brown (defensive lineman) (1943–1997), American football player
 Aaron Brown (linebacker) (born 1956), American football player
 Aaron Brown (running back) (born 1985), American football player
 Aaron Burbridge (born 1993), American football player
 Aaron Colvin (born 1991), American football player
 Aaron Corp (born 1989), American football player and coach
 Aaron Cox (born 1965), American football player
 Aaron Craver (born 1965), American football player
 Aaron Crawford (born 1986), Canadian football player
 Aaron Crawford (born 1997), American football player
 Aaron Curry (born 1986), American football player and coach
 Aaron Dashiell, American football player
 Aaron Dobson (born 1991), American football player
 Aaron Donald (born 1991), American football player
 Aaron Donkor (born 1995), German football player
 Aaron Elling (born 1978), American football player
 Aaron Fairooz (born 1983), Canadian football player
 Aaron Fiacconi (born 1979), Canadian football player
 Aaron Fields (born 1976), American football player
 Aaron Francisco (born 1983), American football player
 Aaron Fuller, American football player
 Aaron Garcia (born 1970), American football player
 Aaron Gibson (born 1977), American football player
 Aaron Glenn (born 1972), American football player and coach
 Aaron Graham (born 1973), American football player
 Aaron Grant (1908–1966), American football player
 Aaron Green (born 1992), American football player
 Aaron Grymes (born 1991), Canadian football player
 Aaron Halterman (born 1982), American football player
 Aaron Hargreaves (born 1986), Canadian football player
 Aaron Shawn Harper (born 1968), American football player
 Aaron Hayden (American football) (born 1973), American football player
 Aaron Hernandez (1989–2017), American football player
 Aaron Hester (born 1990), American football player
 Aaron Hosack (born 1981), American football player
 Aaron Hunt (gridiron football) (born 1980), American Canadian football player
 Aaron Jones (defensive end) (born 1966), American football player
 Aaron Jones (running back) (born 1994), American football player
 Aaron Kampman (born 1979), American football player
 Aaron Keen (born 1972), American football player and coach
 Aaron Kelly (Canadian football) (born 1986), Canadian football player
 Aaron Kelton (born 1974), American college football coach and administrator
 Aaron Koch (born 1978), American football player
 Aaron Kromer (born 1967), American football coach
 Aaron Kyle (born 1954), American football player
 Aaron Laing (born 1971), American football player
 Aaron Lavarias (born 1988), Canadian football player
 Aaron Lesué (born 1982), American football player
 Aaron Lockett (gridiron football) (born 1978), American football player
 Aaron Lynch (American football) (born 1993), American football player
 Aaron Martin (American football) (born 1941), American football player
 Aaron Maybin (born 1988), American football player
 Aaron McConnell (born 1980), American football player
 Aaron McCreary (1892–1900s), American football, basketball, and baseball player and coach
 Aaron Mellette (born 1989), American football player
 Aaron Merz (born 1983), American football player
 Aaron Mills (born 1972), American football kicker
 Aaron Milton (born 1992), Canadian football player
 Aaron Mitchell (American football) (born 1956), American football player
 Aaron Moog (born 1962), American football player
 Aaron Moorehead (born 1980), American football player
 Aaron Morgan (born 1988), American football player
 Aaron Murray (born 1990), American football player
 Aaron Neary (born 1992), American football player
 Aaron Oliker (1903–1965), American football player
 Aaron Parker (American football), American football player
 Aaron Patrick (born 1996), American football player
 Aaron Pearson (born 1964), American football player
 Aaron Peck (American football) (born 1994), American football player
 Aaron Pelch (born 1977), American college athletics administrator and football coach
 Aaron Pettrey (born 1986), American football kicker
 Aaron Pierce (American football) (born 1969), American football player
 Aaron Ripkowski (born 1992), American football player
 Aaron Robbins (born 1983), American football player
 Aaron Robinson (American football) (born 1998), American football player
Aaron Roderick (born 1972), American football player and coach
Aaron Rodgers (born 1983), American football player
Aaron Rosenberg (1912–1979), American football player, and film and television producer
Aaron Ross (born 1982), American football player 
Aaron Rouse (born 1984), American football player 
Aaron Schobel (born 1977), American football player 
Aaron Shea (born 1976), American football player 
Aaron Smith (American football) (born 1976), American football player 
Aaron Sparrow (born 1972), American football player
Aaron Stecker (born 1975), American football player 
Aaron Stinnie (born 1994), American football player
Aaron Taylor (American football, born 1972), American football player
Aaron Taylor (American football, born 1975), American football player
Aaron Thomas (American football) (born 1937), American football player
Aaron Turner (American football) (born 1971), American football player
Aaron Wagner (born 1982), Canadian football player
Aaron Walker (American football) (born 1980), American football player
Aaron Wallace (born 1967), American football player
Aaron Wallace Jr. (born 1993), American football player
Aaron Williams (American football) (born 1990), American football player
Aaron Wilmer (born 1992), American football player
Aaron Woods (gridiron football) (born 1986), American football player and coach

Golf 

 Aaron Baddeley (born 1981), Australian golfer
 Aaron Goldberg (golfer) (born 1985), American golfer
 Aaron Leitmannstetter (born 1993), German golfer
 Aaron Rai (born 1995), English golfer
 Aaron Townsend (born 1981), Australian golfer
 Aaron Watkins (golfer) (born 1982), American golfer
 Aaron Wise (golfer) (born 1996), American golfer

Hockey 

 Aaron Boh (born 1974), Canadian ice hockey player
 Aaron Boogaard (born 1986), Canadian ice hockey player
 Aaron Brand (born 1975), Canadian ice hockey player
 Aaron Brocklehurst (born 1985), Canadian ice hockey player
 Aaron Broten (born 1960), American ice hockey player
 Aaron Dell (born 1989), Canadian ice hockey goaltender
 Aaron Downey (born 1974), Canadian ice hockey player
Aaron Ekblad (born 1996), Canadian ice hockey player
Aaron Fox (ice hockey) (born 1976), American ice hockey player and executive
Aaron Gagnon (born 1986), Canadian ice hockey player
Aaron Gavey (born 1974), Canadian ice hockey player
Aaron Hopkins (born 1979), Australian field hockey player
Aaron Johnson (ice hockey) (born 1983), Canadian ice hockey player
Aaron Keller (born 1975), Canadian-Japanese ice hockey player
Aaron Kershaw (born 1992), Australian field hockey player
Aaron Kleinschmidt (born 1989), Australian field hockey player
Aaron Lewicki (born 1987), American ice hockey player
Aaron MacKenzie (born 1981), Canadian ice hockey player
Aaron Miller (ice hockey) (born 1971), American ice hockey player
Aaron Ness (born 1990), American ice hockey player
Aaron Palushaj (born 1989), American ice hockey player
Aaron Rome (born 1983), Canadian ice hockey player and coach
Aaron Schneekloth (born 1978), Canadian ice hockey player and coach
Aaron Sorochan (born 1984), Canadian ice hockey goaltender
Aaron Volpatti (born 1985), Canadian ice hockey player
Aaron Voros (born 1981), Canadian ice hockey player
Aaron Ward (ice hockey) (born 1973), Canadian ice hockey player

Judo 
Aaron Cohen (judoka) (born 1981), American judoka

Mixed martial arts 

 Aaron Banks (martial artist) (1928–2013), American mixed martial artist
 Aaron Brink (born 1974), American mixed martial artist and pornographic actor
 Aaron Chalmers (television personality) (born 1987), English mixed martial artist and reality television personality
 Aaron Phillips (fighter) (born 1989), American mixed martial artist
 Aaron Pico (born 1996), American mixed martial artist
 Aaron Riley (born 1980), American mixed martial artist
 Aaron Rosa (born 1983), American mixed martial artist
 Aaron Simpson (fighter) (born 1974), American mixed martial artist

Motorsports and racing 

 Aaron Burkart (born 1982), German rally driver
 Aaron Cameron (born 2000), Australian racing driver
 Aaron Caratti (born 1980), Australian racing driver
 Aaron Fike (born 1982), American racing driver
 Aaron Gate (born 1990), New Zealand racing cyclist
 Aaron Gryder (born 1970), American horse racing jockey
 Aaron Gwin (born 1987), American downhill mountain biker
 Aaron Johnston (born 1995), Irish rally co-driver
 Aaron Justus (born 1973), American racing driver
 Aaron Keith (born 1971), American para-cyclist
 Aaron Kemps (born 1983), Australian racing cyclist
 Aaron Lim (born 1985), Malaysian racing driver
 Aaron Mason, British racing driver
 Aaron Olsen (born 1978), American road bicycle racer
 Aaron Quine (born 1972), American racing driver
 Aaron Schooler (born 1985), Canadian cyclo-cross cyclist
 Aaron Seton (born 1998), Australian racing driver
 Aaron Slight (born 1966), New Zealand motorcycle racer
 Aaron Summers (speedway rider) (born 1988), Australian speedway rider
 Aaron Telitz (born 1991), American racing driver
 Aaron Trent (born 1986), American Paralympic cyclist
 Aaron Van Poucke (born 1998), Belgian cyclist
 Aaron Verwilst (born 1997), Belgian cyclist
 Aaron Williamson (born 1992), British racing driver
 Aaron Yates (motorcyclist) (born 1973), American motorcycle racer

Rugby 

 Aaron Abrams (rugby union) (born 1979), Canadian rugby player
 Aaron Bancroft (rugby union) (born 1985), New Zealand rugby player
 Aaron Booth (rugby league) (born 1995), Australian rugby player
 Aaron Bramwell (born 1986), Welsh rugby player
 Aaron Brown (rugby league) (born 1992), British rugby player
 Aaron Cannings (born 1981), New Zealand rugby player
 Aaron Carpenter (rugby union) (born 1983), Canadian rugby player
 Aaron Carroll (rugby union) (born 1993), New Zealand rugby player
 Aaron Collins (rugby union) (born 1971), New Zealand rugby player
 Aaron Conneely (born 1992), Irish rugby player
 Aaron Coundley (born 1989), Welsh rugby player
 Aaron Cruden (born 1989), New Zealand rugby player
 Aaron Dundon (born 1982), New Zealand rugby player
 Aaron Findlay, Russian rugby player
 Aaron Gorrell (born 1981), Australian rugby player
 Aaron Grainger (born 1978), Australian rugby player
 Aaron Gray (rugby league) (born 1994), Australian rugby player
 Aaron Groom (born 1987), Fijian rugby player
 Aaron Heremaia (born 1982), New Zealand rugby player
 Aaron Hinkley (born 1999), English rugby player
 Aaron Hopa (1971–1998), New Zealand rugby player
 Aaron Jarvis (rugby union) (born 1986), Welsh rugby player
 Aaron Ketchell (born 1977), Australian rugby player
 Aaron Lester (born 1973), New Zealand rugby player
 Aaron Liffchak (born 1985), English rugby player
 Aaron Mauger (born 1980), New Zealand rugby player and coach
 Aaron McCloskey (born 1988), Irish rugby player
 Aaron Morgan (rugby league) (born 1978), Australian rugby player
 Aaron Morris (rugby union) (born 1995), English rugby player
 Aaron Moule (born 1977), Australian rugby player
 Aaron Murphy (born 1988), English rugby player
 Aaron O'Sullivan (born 1999), Irish rugby player
 Aaron Ollett (born 1992), English rugby player
 Aaron Payne (born 1982), Australian rugby player and coach
 Aaron Persico (born 1978), Italian rugby player
 Aaron Phipps (born 1983), British wheelchair rugby player
 Aaron Raper (born 1971), Australian rugby player
 Aaron Schoupp (born 2001), Australian rugby player
 Aaron Sexton (born 2000), Irish rugby player
 Aaron Shingler (born 1987), English rugby player
 Aaron Smith (rugby league, born 1982), British rugby player
 Aaron Smith (rugby union) (born 1988), New Zealand rugby player
 Aaron Smith (born 1996), British rugby player
 Aaron Summers (rugby league) (born 1981), Australian rugby player
 Aaron Teroi (born 1995), Australian rugby player
 Aaron Trinder (born 1980), New Zealand rugby player
 Aaron Wainwright (born 1997), Welsh rugby player
 Aaron Wheatley (born 1981), Australian rugby player
 Aaron Whitchurch (born 1992), Australian rugby  player
 Aaron Whittaker (born 1968), New Zealander rugby player
Aaron Woods (born 1991), Australian rugby player

Football/soccer 

 Aaron Amadi-Holloway (born 1993), Welsh footballer
 Aaron Anderson (soccer) (born 2000), Australian soccer player
 Aaron Appindangoyé (born 1992), Gabonese footballer
 Aaron Astudillo (born 2000), Venezuelan-Chilean footballer
 Aaron Barnes (footballer) (born 1996), English footballer
 Aaron Barry (born 1992), Irish footballer
 Aaron Bastiaans (born 2002), Dutch footballer
 Aaron Benjamin (born 1979), Canadian footballer
 Aaron Bentley (born 1995), English footballer
 Aaron Berzel (born 1992), German footballer
 Aaron Black (born 1983), Irish footballer
 Aaron Black (footballer, born 1990), Australian football player
 Aaron Black (footballer, born 1992), Australian football player
 Aaron Boupendza (born 1996), Gabonese footballer
 Aaron Brown (footballer, born 1980), English footballer
 Aaron Brown (footballer, born 1983), English footballer
 Aaron Callaghan (footballer, born 1966), Irish footballer and manager
 Aaron Calver (born 1996), Australian footballer
 Aaron Cervantes (born 2002), American soccer goalkeeper
 Aaron Chalmers (footballer) (born 1991), English footballer
 Aaron Chandler (born 1983), American soccer player and attorney
 Aaron Chapman (born 1990), English football goalkeeper
 Aaron Clapham (born 1987), New Zealand footballer and coach
 Aaron Collins (footballer) (born 1997), Welsh footballer
 Aaron Comrie (born 1997), Scottish footballer
 Aaron Connolly (Scottish footballer) (born 1991)
 Aaron Connolly (Irish footballer) (born 2000)
 Aaron Conway (born 1985), Scottish footballer
 Aaron Cook (footballer) (born 1979), Welsh footballer
 Aaron Cornelius (born 1990), Australian rules footballer
 Aaron Cosgrave (born 1999), English footballer
 Aaron Cresswell (born 1989), English footballer
 Aaron Dankwah (born 1993), Ghanaian footballer
 Aaron Davey (born 1983), Australian rules football player
 Aaron Dawson (born 1992), English footballer
 Aaron DeLoach (born 1983), American soccer player
 Aaron Dennis (born 1993), American soccer player
 Aaron Dhondt (born 1995), Belgian footballer
 Aaron Doran (born 1991), Irish footballer
 Aaron Downes (born 1985), Australian footballer and manager
 Aaron Drewe (born 2001), English footballer
 Aaron Drinan (born 1998), Irish footballer
 Aaron Edwards (football) (born 1979), Gibraltarian football manager and team co-owner
 Aaron Edwards (born 1984), Australian rules footballer
 Aaron Eichhorn (born 1998), German footballer
 Aaron Essel (born 2005), Ghanaian footballer
 Aaron Evans (born 1994), Australian footballer
 Aaron Evans-Harriott (born 2002), English footballer
 Aaron Fiora (born 1981), Australian rules footballer
 Aaron Flahavan (1975–2001), English football goalkeeper
 Aaron Flood, Gaelic footballer
 Aaron Francis (born 1997), Australian rules footballer
 Aaron Goulding (born 1982), Australian footballer
 Aaron Greaves (born 1977), Australian rules footballer and coach
 Aaron Grundy (born 1988), English footballer
 Aaron Hall (footballer) (born 1990), Australian rules footballer
 Aaron Hamill (born 1977), Australian rules footballer
 Aaron Hardy (born 1986), English footballer
 Aaron Hayden (footballer) (born 1997), English footballer
 Aaron Heap (born 2000), English footballer
 Aaron Heinzen (born 1979), American soccer player
 Aaron Henneman (born 1980), Australian rules footballer
 Aaron Henry (footballer) (born 2003), English footballer
 Aaron Herrera (soccer) (born 1997), American soccer player
 Aaron Herzog (born 1998), German footballer
 Aaron Hickey (born 2002), Scottish footballer
 Aaron Hoey, Irish Gaelic footballer
 Aaron Hohlbein (born 1985), American soccer player
 Aaron Horton (born 1992), American soccer player
 Aaron Hughes (born 1979), Northern Irish footballer
 Aaron Hulme (1886–1933), English footballer
 Aaron Hunt (born 1986), German footballer
 Aaron Ibilola (born 1997), Beninese footballer
 Aaron Leya Iseka (born 1997), Belgian footballer
 Aaron James (footballer) (born 1976), Australian rules footballer
 Aaron Jarvis (footballer) (born 1998), English footballer
 Aaron Jones (footballer, born 1881) (1881–1954), English footballer
 Aaron Jones (footballer, born 1994), English footballer
 Aaron Joseph (born 1989), Australian rules footballer
 Aaron Katebe (born 1992), Zambian footballer
 Aaron Keating (born 1974), Australian rules footballer
 Aaron Kernan, Northern Irish Gaelic footballer
 Aaron King (born 1984), American soccer player
 Aaron Kircher (born 1991), Austrian footballer
 Aaron Kovar (born 1993), American soccer player
 Aaron Kuhl (born 1996), English footballer
 Aaron Labonte (born 1983), English footballer
 Aaron Lawrence (footballer) (born 1970), Jamaican footballer
 Aaron Ledgister (born 1988), English footballer
 Aaron Lennon (born 1987), English footballer
 Aaron Lennox (born 1993), Australian footballer
 Aaron Lescott (born 1978), English footballer
 Aaron Leventhal (born 1974), American soccer player
 Aaron Lewis (footballer) (born 1998), Welsh footballer
 Aaron Lockett (1892–1965), English footballer and cricketer
 Aaron Long (soccer) (born 1992), American soccer player
 Aaron López (footballer) (born 1983), Mexican footballer
 Aaron Lord (born 1975), Australian rules footballer
 Aaron Martin (footballer, born 1989), English footballer
 Aaron Martin (footballer, born 1991), English footballer
 Aaron Maund (born 1990), American soccer player
 Aaron McCarey (born 1992), Irish football goalkeeper
 Aaron McEneff (born 1995), Irish footballer
 Aaron McFarland (born 1972), New Zealand footballer and coach
 Aaron McGowan (born 1997), English footballer
 Aaron McLean (born 1983), English footballer
 Aaron Meijers (born 1987), Dutch footballer
 Aaron Millbank (born 1995), English footballer
 Aaron Mokoena (born 1980), South African footballer
 Aaron Molinas (born 2000), Argentine footballer
 Aaron Molloy (born 1997), Irish footballer
 Aaron Mooy (born 1990), Australian footballer
 Aaron Morley (born 2000), English footballer
 Aaron Morris (footballer) (born 1989), Welsh footballer
 Aaron Moses-Garvey (born 1989), English footballer
 Aaron Muirhead (born 1990), Scottish footballer
 Aaron Mullett (born 1992), Australian rules footballer
 Aaron Naughton (born 1999), Australian rules footballer
 Aaron Nemane (born 1997), French-English footballer
 Aaron Nguimbat (born 1978), Cameroonian footballer
 Aaron O'Connor (born 1983), English footballer
 Aaron O'Driscoll (born 1999), Irish footballer
 Aaron Samuel Olanare (born 1994), Nigerian footballer
 Aaron Opoku (born 1999), German footballer
 Aaron Parker (born 1986), American soccer player
 Aaron Patton (born 1979), English footballer
 Aaron Payas (born 1985), Gibraltarian footballer
 Aaron Paye (born 1981), American-Liberian footballer
 Aaron Perez (born 1986), American soccer player
 Aaron Phillips (footballer) (born 1993), English footballer
 Aaron Pierre (born 1993), English footballer
 Aaron Pitchkolan (born 1983), American soccer player
 Aaron Pressley (born 2001), Scottish footballer
 Aaron Ramsey (footballer, born 2003), English footballer
 Aaron Ramsdale (born 1998), English footballer
Aaron Ramsey (born 1990), Welsh footballer
Aaron Reardon (soccer) (born 1999), Australian footballer
Aaron Rogers (born 1984), Australian rules footballer
Aaron Rowe (born 2000), English footballer
Aaron Sandilands (born 1982), Australian rules footballer
Aaron Schoenfeld (born 1990), American-Israeli soccer player
Aaron Scott (footballer) (born 1986), New Zealand footballer
Aaron Seydel (born 1996), German footballer
Aaron Shattock (born 1980), Australian rules footballer
Aaron Simpson (footballer, born 1997), English footballer
Aaron Simpson (footballer, born 1999), English footballer
Aaron Skelton (born 1974), British footballer
Aaron Splaine (born 1996), Scottish footballer
Aaron Steele (footballer, born 1983), English footballer
Aaron Steele (footballer, born 1987), English footballer
Aaron Tabacchi (born 1998), Italian footballer
Aaron Taylor (footballer) (born 1990), English footballer
Aaron Taylor-Sinclair (born 1991), Scottish footballer
Aaron Travis (footballer) (1890–1966), English footballer
Aaron Tredway (born 1976), American soccer player, author, inspirational speaker, and coach
Aaron Tshibola (born 1995), English footballer
Aaron Tumwa (born 1993), Antiguan footballer
Aaron Walker (soccer) (born 1990), American soccer player
Aaron Wan-Bissaka (born 1997), English footballer
Aaron Webster (footballer) (born 1980), English footballer
Aaron Westervelt (born 1979), Australian footballer
Aaron Wheeler (born 1988), American soccer player
Aaron Wilbraham (born 1979), English footballer
Aaron Wildig (born 1992), English footballer
Aaron Williams (footballer) (born 1993), English footballer
Aaron Xuereb (born 1979), Maltan footballer
Aaron Young (footballer) (born 1992), Australian rules footballer

Swimming 

 Aaron Bidois, New Zealand paralympic swimmer
 Aaron Moores (born 1994), British paralympic swimmer
 Aaron Peirsol (born 1983), American swimmer
 Aaron Rhind (born 1991), Australian swimmer

Track and field 

 Aaron Armstrong (born 1977), Trinidad and Tobagian track and field sprinter
 Aaron Barclay (born 1992), New Zealand triathlete
 Aaron Booth (born 1996), New Zealand decathlete
 Aaron Brown (sprinter) (born 1992), Canadian sprinter
 Aaron Chatman (born 1987), Australian paralympic athlete
 Aaron Cleare (born 1983), Bahamian sprinter
 Aaron Costello (born 1993), Irish hurler
 Aaron Craig (born 1992), Irish hurler
 Aaron Cunningham (hurler) (born 1993), Irish hurler
 Aaron Dunphy (born 1998), Irish hurler
 Aaron Dupnai (born 1968), Papua New Guinean long-distance runner
 Aaron Egbele (born 1979), Nigerian sprinter
 Aaron Ernest (born 1993), American sprinter
 Aaron Gillane (born 1996), Irish hurler
 Aaron Myers (born 1997), Irish hurler
 Aaron Neighbour (born 1977), Australian discus thrower and shot putter
 Aaron Payne (athlete) (born 1971), American sprinter
 Aaron Pike (athlete) (born 1985/1986), American athlete
 Aaron Ramirez (born 1964), American long-distance runner
 Aaron Royle (born 1990), Australian triathlete
 Aaron Scheidies (born 1982), American Paralympic triathlete
 Aaron Sheehan (hurler) (born 1994), Irish hurler

Wrestling 

 Aaron Aguilera (born 1977), American wrestler and actor
 Aaron Bolo (born 1986), South Korean professional wrestler
 Aaron Brooks (wrestler) (born 2001/2002), American wrestler
 Aaron Idol (born 1980), Canadian wrestler

Other sports 

 Aaron Addison (born 1995), Australian tennis player
 Aaron Alexandre (1765/68–1850), German-French-English chess player
 Aaron Beeney (born 1984), English darts player
 Aaron Blunck (born 1996), American freestyle skier
 Aaron Bold (born 1985), Canadian lacrosse player
 Aaron Canavan (born 1975), Jersey snooker player
 Aaron Chia (born 1997), Malaysian badminton player
 Aaron Codina (born 1999), Chilean handball player
 Aaron Cohen (judoka), American judoka
 Aaron Cook (taekwondo) (born 1991), British-Moldovan taekwondo athlete
 Aaron Cross (born 1975), American quadriplegic archer
 Aaron Ewen (born 1996/1997), New Zealand paralympic alpine skier
 Aaron Feinberg (born 1981), American inline skater
 Aaron Feinstein (fl. 1903–1910), Estonian chess player
 Aaron Feltham (born 1982), Canadian water polo player
 Aaron Fenton (born 1982), American lacrosse goaltender
 Aaron Fernandes (born 1956), Canadian field hockey player
 Aaron Fotheringham (born 1991), American wheelchair athlete
 Aaron Frankcomb (born 1985), Australian squash player
 Aaron Fukuhara (born 1991), American judoka
 Aaron Goodwin, American sports agent
 Aaron Hadlow (born 1988), British kiteboarder
 Aaron Herman (born 1953), American rower
 Aaron Hill (snooker player) (born 2002), Irish snooker player
 Aaron Kanter, American poker player
 Aaron Kostner (born 1999), Italian nordic combined skier
 Aaron Krickstein (born 1967), American tennis player
 Aaron Lindström (born 2000), Swedish male paralympic alpine skier
 Aaron Links (born 1981), American bodybuilder
 Aaron Lowe (born 1974), Canadian ice dancer
 Aaron Maddron (born 1970), American bodybuilder
 Aaron March (born 1986), Italian alpine snowboarder
 Aaron Massey, American poker player and entrepreneur
 Aaron McKibbin (born 1991), English paralympic table tennis player
 Aaron McIntosh (born 1972), New Zealand windsurfer
 Aaron Mensing (born 1997), Danish-German handball player
 Aaron Muss (born 1994), American snowboarder
 Aaron Parchem (born 1977), American figure skater
 Aaron Pollock (born 1967), American rower
 Aaron Russell (born 1993), American volleyball player
 Aaron Sluchinski (born 1987), Canadian curler
 Aaron Squires (born 1992), Canadian curler
 Aaron Summerscale (born 1969), English chess player
 Aaron Tennant (born 1991), Irish lawn bowler
 Aaron Teys (born 1993), Australian lawn and indoor bowler
 Aaron Tran (born 1996), American short track speed skater
 Aaron Van Cleave (born 1987), German pair skater
 Aaron Wilson (lacrosse) (born 1980), Canadian lacrosse player
 Aaron Wilson (bowls) (born 1991), Australian lawn bowler
 Aaron Wolf (judoka) (born 1996), Japanese judoka
 Aaron Younger (born 1991), Australian water polo player
 Aaron Zang (born 1982), Chinese poker player

Academia
 Aaron Ben-Ze'ev (born 1949), Israeli philosopher and President of the University of Haifa
Aaron Twerski (born 1939), American lawyer and law professor

Book of Mormon people
Aaron (Jaredite), a Jaredite king mentioned in the Book of Mormon
Aaron (Lamanite), a Lamanite mentioned in the Book of Mormon
Aaron (Nephite), the Nephite missionary mentioned in the Book of Mormon

Fictional characters
 Aaron, a character played by Christian Tessier in the 2004 American science fiction disaster movie The Day After Tomorrow
 Aaron Hotchner, one of the main protagonists in Criminal Minds
 Aaron the moor, fictional character in Titus Andronicus by Shakespeare
 Aaron (Beyblade), fictional character in Beyblade
 Aaron Cross, the main protagonist in the 2012 film The Bourne Legacy
 Aaron (Pokémon), the first of four leaders in the Elite Four in Pokémon Diamond, Pokémon Pearl and Pokémon Platinum
 Aaron Dingle, fictional character in British soap Emmerdale
 Aaron Fox, one of the Lego Nexo knights
 Aaron Humphrey, a character in the 1994 American made-for-television comedy movie Revenge of the Nerds IV: Nerds in Love
 Sir Aaron, a character in the film Pokémon: Lucario and the Mystery of Mew
 Aaron Ryan, a boxer in Punch-Out!! for the Wii
 Aaron Stone, a character in the Fablehaven series by Brandon Mull
 Aaron Stowe, a main antagonist and later protagonist in The Unwanteds series by Lisa McMann
 Aaron, a main character in Lunar Knights
 Aaron, son of Claire in Lost
 Aaron, a friend of Elena Gilbert in The Vampire Diaries
 Aron Trask, one of the main protagonists in East of Eden by John Steinbeck
 Aaron Warner, a character in Shatter Me series
 Aaron, Alexandria safe-zone recruiter in The Walking Dead
 Aaron, a character in the film Saw VI
 Aaron, an enemy encountered in Undertale

See also
Arron, given name and surname
Aron (name)
Erin, given name

References

Notes

Sources
А. В. Суперанская (A. V. Superanskaya). "Современный словарь личных имён: Сравнение. Происхождение. Написание" (Modern Dictionary of First Names: Comparison. Origins. Spelling). Айрис-пресс. Москва, 2005. 
Н. А. Петровский (N. A. Petrovsky). "Словарь русских личных имён" (Dictionary of Russian First Names). ООО Издательство "АСТ". Москва, 2005. 

English masculine given names
Given names
Jewish given names
Masculine given names
Modern names of Hebrew origin